The Great Wall Pao also known as the POER P11/P12, Cannon, P-Series, RUMAN, or SUCAN is a range of mid-size pick-ups manufactured in China by the Chinese manufacturer Great Wall Motors since 2019.

Overview
The Great Wall Pao debuted on April 16, 2019 during the 2019 Shanghai Auto Show. The Pao is available in three different versions, including a standard passenger model, an off-road model, and a commercial-oriented model. An electric version was also revealed but was not available at launch.

The Pao is built on the P71 platform of Great Wall Motors, which also used for the Haval H9 SUV, and is powered by a 2.0 liter turbo inline-4 gasoline engine code named GW4C20B with a maximum output of 197hp. Four wheel drive is optional and the transmission is a 8-speed automatic gearbox or a 6-speed manual gearbox. The standard cargo bed is sized 1520mm by 1520mm by 538mm.

As the GWM Ute
In October 2020, GWM Australia announced that a version of the Pao badged as the GWM Ute would be launched in the country as a replacement for the Great Wall Steed. The pick-up/ute will be their first vehicle sold under the re-branded GWM name and will be sold in three dual-cab versions: the Cannon, Cannon-L and top-of-the-range Cannon-X. GWM New Zealand also sells the Pao under the same GWM Ute badging.

As the GWM P-Series
In October 2020, Haval South Africa announced that a version of the Pao badged as the GWM P-Series would be launched in the country as an eventual replacement for the Great Wall Steed. In South Africa, the P-Series is sold in three versions: Commercial Single Cab, Commercial Double Cab, and Passenger Double Cab.

As the GWM POER
In December 2021, GWM's distributor in Brunei, Berjaya Sdn Bhd launched a version of the Pao Passenger and Commercial being badged as the POER RUMAN and POER SUCAN respectively. POER is a sub-brand which stands for 'Powerful, Off-road, Enjoyable and Reliable', whilst the words RUMAN and SUCAN are word play from the Malay language, with RUMAN deriving from "Rumah", meaning 'house' and SUCAN coming from the word 'Sukan' which means sports in Malay.

In Malaysia, Great Wall Motor Sales Malaysia will launch two pick-up trucks under the GWM POER name, with the POER P12 being a version of the vehicle launched in Australia as the GWM Cannon Ute and the RUMAN elsewhere, and the POER P11 being the SUCAN model.

Pao EV
In September 26 2020, Great Wall Motor announced an electric version of the Pao equipped with a 150 kW / 300 Nm electric motor. Reported range was up to 405 km.

References

External links

Official website

Pao
Pickup trucks
All-wheel-drive vehicles
Rear-wheel-drive vehicles
Cars introduced in 2019
Trucks of China
Cars of China